Taylor Frye (1864 – January 14, 1946) was an educator and politician.

Born in Pennsylvania, Frye moved with his parents to Wisconsin in 1875. Frye went to the public schools and graduated from River Falls Normal School. He also took an agriculture course at University of Wisconsin. Frye owned a farm in the village of Fairchild, Eau Claire, Wisconsin. Frye taught in public high schools and in teaches institutes. Frye served as Fairchild Village Treasurer and on the Eau Claire County Board of Supervisors. in 1911, Frye served in the Wisconsin State Assembly and was a Republican. In 1911, Frye moved to Madison, Wisconsin. He was the head of the woman and child labor division of the Wisconsin State Industrial Commission. Frye died in a hospital in Madison, Wisconsin.

Notes

1864 births
1946 deaths
Educators from Pennsylvania
People from Fairchild, Wisconsin
Politicians from Madison, Wisconsin
University of Wisconsin–Madison College of Agricultural and Life Sciences alumni
University of Wisconsin–River Falls alumni
Farmers from Wisconsin
Educators from Wisconsin
County supervisors in Wisconsin
Republican Party members of the Wisconsin State Assembly